Reyna Angélica Marroquín (December 2, 1941 – January 1969) was a Salvadoran woman who was murdered in the United States in 1969. Marroquín's murder was not discovered until 1999, 30 years later, when her body was found in the Jericho, New York, former home of Howard B. Elkins, a businessman who was identified as the prime suspect. Elkins committed suicide before he could be charged or thoroughly questioned.

Crime
On September 2, 1999, an old 55-gallon drum in the crawl space of a house in Jericho, Nassau County, New York, was found to contain the mummified remains of a pregnant Hispanic female in her late 20s between 145 and 152 cm (4'9" and 5'0") tall, with unusual dental work. The cause of death was determined to be blunt force trauma to the head. The drum also contained polystyrene pellets, two rings (one inscribed "M.H.R."), a locket inscribed "To Patrice Love Uncle Phil", green dye, a plastic artificial plant stem, and an address book.

The drum had been made in 1965 for transporting dye. Markings showed it had been shipped to Melrose Plastics, an artificial flower manufacturing company partly owned by Howard B. Elkins, a local businessman who owned the Jericho house. This was until 1972, when he sold the company and moved to Boca Raton, Florida, with his wife.

Under infrared light, some of the deteriorated address book was legible. A Permanent Residence Card written on the first page belonged to Reyna Angélica Marroquín, a 28-year-old immigrant from El Salvador who had worked as a nanny and for a manufacturer of artificial flowers at a factory on East 34th Street in Manhattan. A phone number in the book belonged to Kathy Andrade, who had been a friend of Marroquín. When contacted, (amazingly, she still had the same phone number since at least 1969), Andrade told the police that Marroquín had been having an extramarital affair with Elkins but had called Andrade to say she had become afraid of him after telling Elkins' wife about the affair. Andrade went to Marroquín's apartment but found it empty and Marroquín was never heard from again. There were reports that a woman fitting Marroquín's description once appeared with a toddler at Melrose Plastics and employees had joked that the child's father was, in fact, Elkins.

Investigation
Detectives who interviewed Elkins found him uncooperative, and told him they intended to obtain an order to take his DNA for comparison with that of the fetus found inside Marroquín. The next day, September 10, 1999, Elkins was found dead in the back seat of a neighbor's car from a self-inflicted gunshot wound from a 12-gauge Mossberg 500 pump-action shotgun he purchased at a Walmart store that day found between his legs.
The DNA testing found that Elkins was the father of the fetus.

Investigators believe Elkins either went to Marroquín's New Jersey apartment or lured her to the factory and killed her. He then took her body to the Nassau County house, possibly with the intention of dumping her in the ocean from his boat, but after filling the barrel with plastic pellets to ensure it would sink, he found it too heavy to move and left it in the crawl space.

Writer Oscar Corral went to San Martín, San Salvador, where Marroquín's 95-year-old mother told him she had dreamt about Marroquín trapped inside a barrel. Marroquín was buried in El Salvador; her mother died a month later and was buried with her.

Cultural references
The peculiar circumstances of the crime inspired several media treatments of the Marroquín case. The murder provided part of a 2004 episode called "Broken Trust" in the series The New Detectives. The investigation into her murder was covered in "Flower Drum Murder", a 2015 episode of Murder Book, a true crime television series. This case was used as the plot of an episode of NYPD Blue, "Roll Out the Barrel" (April 25, 2000). The case was depicted in "A Voice from Beyond", a 2000 episode of the true crime series Forensic Files. The murder was dramatized in the Investigation Discovery series Grave Secrets, Season 2, Episode 1 in an episode entitled, "Beneath the Stairs" first airing on November 14, 2017. Yet another treatment of the case was an episode called "Lady in a Barrel" in Oxygen's series Buried in the Backyard, originally aired on June 17, 2018. It was also partial inspiration for the 2020 short film "Blood of Another."  In episode 150, Georgia Hardstark covered the murder on the podcast, My Favorite Murder.

See also
List of solved missing person cases
List of unsolved murders

References

1960s missing person cases
1969 in New York (state)
1969 murders in the United States
Deaths by beating in the United States
Deaths by person in the United States
Formerly missing people
Missing person cases in New York (state)
Nassau County, New York
Violence against women in the United States
Female murder victims
History of women in New York (state)